Walton Airport , also known as Walton Airfield, is situated near Model Town, 10 km (6 mi) from the city centre of Lahore, in Punjab province of Pakistan. It was founded in 1918 and is named after Sir Colonel Cusack Walton. The airport was active until 1962.

It caters to general aviation and facilitates several flying clubs. The airport is one of the oldest airport in the country and is spread over 300 acres of area.

History
The airport was established in 1918. Later, it served as a British Army in World War II.

In 1930, the Lahore Flying Club was established (then known as Northern India Flying Club) at the site for training of pilots and is the oldest such facility. The thirty acres of land was donated by four Hindu doctors, while the remaining 256 acres were leased from the Government of Punjab, British India.

The airport is named after a former head of flying school, namely Sir Colonel Cusack Walton.

See also
 List of airports in Pakistan

References

External links
History of Walton Aerodrome, Lahore.

Airports in Punjab, Pakistan
Airports in Lahore
Model Town, Lahore
1918 establishments in British India
Airports established in 1918
Pakistan Army airbases